The following is a list of all eighty-four (84) members of the IX Legislative Assembly of El Salvador (2009–2012). The session began on 1 May 2009 and ended on 1 May 2012. The list is ordered alphabetically by departments.

Ahuachapán 

The department of Ahuachapán had four (4) deputies in the Legislative Assembly.

Political affiliations:

Cabañas 

The department of Cabañas had three (3) deputies in the Legislative Assembly.

Political affiliations:

Chalatenango 

The department of Chalatenango had three (3) deputies in the Legislative Assembly.

Political affiliations:

Cuscatlán 

The department of Cuscatlán had three (3) deputies in the Legislative Assembly.

Political affiliations:

La Libertad 

The department of La Libertad had eight (8) deputies in the Legislative Assembly.

Political affiliations:

La Paz 

The department of La Paz had four (4) deputies in the Legislative Assembly.

Political affiliations:

La Unión 

The department of La Unión had four (4) deputies in the Legislative Assembly.

Political affiliations:

Morazán 

The department of Morazán had three (3) deputies in the Legislative Assembly.

Political affiliations:

San Miguel 

The department of San Miguel had six (6) deputies in the Legislative Assembly.

Political affiliations:

San Salvador 

The department of San Salvador had twenty-five (25) deputies in the Legislative Assembly.

Political affiliations:

San Vicente 

The department of San Vicente had three (3) deputies in the Legislative Assembly.

Political affiliations:

Santa Ana 

The department of Santa Ana had seven (7) deputies in the Legislative Assembly.

Political affiliations:

Sonsonate 

The department of Sonsonate had six (6) deputies in the Legislative Assembly.

Political affiliations:

Usulután 

The department of Usulután had five (5) deputies in the Legislative Assembly.

Political affiliations:

Bibliography

External links 

 Official website of the Legislative Assembly

Politics of El Salvador
Government of El Salvador